Hannah Müller (born 19 July 2000) is a Swiss female canoeist who was finalist at senior level at the 2018 and 2019 Wildwater Canoeing World Championships.

References

External links
 

2000 births
Living people
Swiss female canoeists
Place of birth missing (living people)